Donald McNab Robertson (7 October 1905 – 14 June 1949) was a Scottish athlete who competed in the 1936 Summer Olympics.

He was born in Glasgow and died there from a pulmonary embolism aged 43.

In 1936 he finished seventh in the Olympic marathon event.

At the 1934 Empire Games he won the silver medal in the marathon competition. Four years later he finished fourth in the marathon contest at the 1938 Empire Games.

External links
sports-reference.com

1905 births
1949 deaths
Sportspeople from Glasgow
Scottish male long-distance runners
Olympic athletes of Great Britain
Athletes (track and field) at the 1936 Summer Olympics
Athletes (track and field) at the 1934 British Empire Games
Athletes (track and field) at the 1938 British Empire Games
Commonwealth Games silver medallists for Scotland
Commonwealth Games medallists in athletics
Deaths from pulmonary embolism
Medallists at the 1934 British Empire Games